Jossy is a given name. Notable people with the name include:

Jossy Dombraye, Nigerian footballer and manager
Jossy Mansur (1934–2016), Aruban newspaper editor

See also
Josey